Rodin Cem Deprem (born 23 May 1998) is a Swedish footballer who is currently without a club.

Club career

Rynninge IK 
Deprem spent the first years of his childhood in the city of Gävle before moving to Örebro at the age of six. In his new home town Deprem started playing football for the local club Rynninge IK. During his young teens Deprem performed well in the youth teams which resulted in the club giving him the chance to play in the Swedish Division 2 at the age of 16. Deprem played in the senior squad for two and a half seasons before leaving.

Örebro SK
Deprem left Rynninge to join Örebro SK in the summer of 2016. After an impressive period during 2017, he managed to set the record for most goals scored in the U19 Allsvenskan until date with 29 goals in 22 games.  The season caught the eye of several clubs, and Deprem was close to signing with Dutch club De Graafschap but the deal was stopped due to the clubs disagreeing on terms.

Later Deprem signed a professional contract with Örebro SK and was promoted to the first team in 2018. During his first season in Allsvenskan, Deprem played 8 games, 1 from start and 7 as a substitute. During his second season Deprem played 5 games, 2 from start and 3 as a substitute. After the 2019 season, Deprem left the club due to lack of playing time.

Greuther Fürth II
On the 29 of January 2020 it was confirmed, that Deprem had joined the reserve team of SpVgg Greuther Fürth. Deprem was only able to play one league game before it was declared that the league would postponed due to the corona pandemic.

Umeå FC
Deprem moved back to Sweden and on the 21 of August 2020, he joined Superettan club Umeå FC on a deal for the rest of 2020, with an option for a further year.

Brommapojkarna
On 27 July 2021, Deprem signed a 2.5-year contract with Brommapojkarna.

Gençlerbirliği
On 17 January 2023, Deprem joined TFF First League club Gençlerbirliği on a 1.5-year deal. However, his contract was terminated by the club the very next day.

References

External links 
 

Swedish people of Turkish descent
Swedish footballers
Swedish expatriate footballers
1998 births
Living people
Division 2 (Swedish football) players
Allsvenskan players
Regionalliga players
Superettan players
Ettan Fotboll players
Örebro SK players
SpVgg Greuther Fürth II players
Umeå FC players
IF Brommapojkarna players
Association football forwards
Swedish expatriate sportspeople in Germany
Expatriate footballers in Germany
People from Gävle
Sportspeople from Gävleborg County